Erumeli South  is a village in Kottayam district in the state of Kerala, India.

Demographics
 India census, Erumeli South had a population of 43,988 with 21,616 males and 22,372 females.

References

Villages in Kottayam district